Dafni is a suburb of Athens, Greece. Since the 2011 local government reform it is part of the municipality Dafni-Ymittos, of which it is the seat and a municipal unit.

Geography
Dafni is an inner suburb of Athens, 2 km south of the Acropolis of Athens. Its built-up area is continuous with that of municipality of Athens and the surrounding suburbs Nea Smyrni, Agios Dimitrios and Ymittos. Dafni metro station is served by Line 2 of the Athens Metro. The main thoroughfare is Vouliagmenis Avenue, which connects Dafni with Athens city centre. At 1.375 km² it is one of the smallest municipal units in the Athens urban and metropolitan area.

Sports
The Amyntas Dafnis HEBA basketball club (A2 Division) competes at the Dafni Indoor Hall.

References

External links

Official website 

Populated places in Central Athens (regional unit)